Patriarch Cyril II may refer to:

 Pope Cyril II of Alexandria, Pope of Alexandria & Patriarch of the See of St. Mark in 1078–1092
 Patriarch Cyril II of Alexandria, Greek Patriarch of Alexandria in the 12th century
 Cyril II of Constantinople, Ecumenical Patriarch of Constantinople in 1633, 1635–1636 and 1638–1639
 Patriarch Cyril II of Jerusalem (ruled in 1846–1872)